Procambarus orcinus, known as the Woodville Karst cave crayfish, is a species of crayfish in the family Cambaridae. It is endemic to the Woodville Karst Plain in the United States. This species has been reported from eight solutional caves in southern Leon County as well as six caves in Wakulla County, Florida.

References

Cambaridae
Endemic fauna of Florida
Freshwater crustaceans of North America
Cave crayfish
Taxonomy articles created by Polbot
Crustaceans described in 1972
Taxa named by Horton H. Hobbs Jr.